Josepha Madigan (born 21 May 1970) is an Irish Fine Gael politician who has served as Minister of State for Special Education and Inclusion since July 2020. She has been a Teachta Dála (TD) for the Dublin Rathdown constituency since 2016. She previously served as Minister for Culture, Heritage, and the Gaeltacht from November 2017 to June 2020, and as Chair of the Committee on Budgetary Oversight from July 2017 to November 2017.

Early and personal life
Madigan was born in Dublin in 1970. She attended Mount Anville Secondary School and Trinity College Dublin. She is married to Finbarr Hayes, and they have two children. Her father, Patrick Madigan, was a Fianna Fáil County Councillor in Dublin, her mother, Patricia Madigan, was a barrister who had a background in Fine Gael. She and her family live in Mount Merrion. Madigan is a survivor of sexual assault.

Legal career
Madigan is a qualified solicitor, who practised in family law for twenty years, prior to her election to Dáil Éireann. She is also certified as a mediator by the Mediators’ Institute of Ireland and is a previous Council member of the MII. She is a former Specialist Liaison Officer for Family Mediation in the MII.

Madigan is the author of the first book in Ireland on mediation: "Appropriate Dispute Resolution in Ireland, a handbook for family lawyers and their clients" (Jordan Publishing, 2012). She has also self-published a novel called Negligent Behaviour.

Political career

County Councillor (2014–2016)
Madigan served as a Councillor for the Stillorgan Ward on Dun Laoghaire-Rathdown County Council, from May 2014 until her election as a TD in 2016.

Madigan issued a leaflet in 2014 claimed that providing accommodation for Travellers in her constituency would be "a waste of valuable resources". When asked about this later, Madigan claimed "Some people won't want to live beside people in halting sites [...] there might be more crime, that there might be anti-social behaviour".

Dáil Éireann
Madigan was elected to Dáil Éireann following the 2016 general election as a Fine Gael TD for the Dublin Rathdown constituency, beating sitting Fine Gael TD Alan Shatter by nearly 1,000 votes. She was appointed Chair of the Committee on Budgetary Oversight in July 2017.

Prior to becoming a minister, she was an active member of the Public Accounts Committee. She also brought forward a private member's bill to reduce the waiting time for divorce in Ireland from four years to two, which was passed by the Dáil.

On 30 November 2017, Madigan was appointed to the cabinet as Minister for Culture, Heritage and the Gaeltacht, in a reshuffle following the resignation of the Tánaiste Frances Fitzgerald.

On 29 March 2018, the then Taoiseach Leo Varadkar appointed Madigan as the coordinator for the Fine Gael Yes campaign in the referendum to repeal the Eighth Amendment.

She was re-elected in February 2020, taking the third seat behind Green Party Deputy Leader Catherine Martin and party colleague Neale Richmond. On 1 July 2020, Madigan was appointed Minister of State for Special Education and Inclusion by Taoiseach Micheál Martin. On 14 January 2021, Madigan came under fire for describing children without additional needs as 'normal' while speaking in the Dáil. "We all know that even for normal children remote teaching is difficult but for children who have additional needs it is particularly difficult," she said. Later that day on Twitter, the minister said she 'sincerely apologises for the language she used.' "It is absolutely not what I meant to say."

On 20 January 2021, speaking on RTÉ's Today with Claire Byrne, Madigan compared children with additional needs not attending school to the mother and baby homes. "We've spent the last week talking about mother and baby homes, where our most vulnerable were left to their own devices in less than satisfactory conditions and we're now allowing further anxiety and upset to be placed on the shoulders of parents whose children desperately need to go back to school." The Final Report of the Commission of Investigation into Mother and Baby Homes and Related Matters was published the week prior to Madigan's comments. Madigan later apologised in a statement: "I am, as are all involved in supporting these children [children with additional needs], passionate about vindicating their rights and in reaching for an analogy I chose poorly. I apologise fully."

Shortly after the first report of the Creeslough explosion on 7 October 2022, Madigan tweeted that she hoped "they find the culprits" and, after being criticised as irresponsible and insensitive, Madigan quickly deleted the tweet.

Maria Bailey legal claim

In 2019, Madigan received widespread coverage for her role in the personal injury legal claim of Fine Gael politician, Maria Bailey. It was alleged that Madigan's law practice, Madigan Solicitors, advised Bailey on her claim, however, Madigan refused to make any comments on this citing client-solicitor confidentiality. In July 2019, an internal unpublished Fine Gael probe into the affair cleared Madigan of any wrongdoing in regard to the claim. In late July 2019, the Irish Independent reported that "it is now known that she advised Ms Bailey in the early stages of the claim". It was also reported that Madigan's firm would earn €11,500 in fees if the Maria Bailey case had been successful.

References

External links

Josepha Madigan's page on the Finel Gael website

1970 births
Living people
Fine Gael TDs
Irish solicitors
Local councillors in Dún Laoghaire–Rathdown
Members of the 32nd Dáil
Women government ministers of the Republic of Ireland
Alumni of Trinity College Dublin
People educated at Mount Anville Secondary School
Members of the 33rd Dáil
21st-century women Teachtaí Dála
Ministers of State of the 33rd Dáil
Women ministers of state of the Republic of Ireland